The House Is Burning is a 2006 German drama film directed by Holger Ernst and starring John Diehl. It was screened out of competition at the 2006 Cannes Film Festival.

Cast
 John Diehl as Mr. Garson
 Melissa Leo as Mrs. Miller
 Julianne Michelle as Terry
 Robin Lord Taylor as Phil
 Erik Jensen as Carl
 Harley Adams as Steve Garson
 Nicole Vicius as Valerie
 Joe Petrilla as Mike Miller
 Carson Grant as The Preacher
 David Tennent as Jason
 Emily Meade as Anne
 Robert Scorrano as Army Recruiter
 Jeff Green as Army Officer
 Samantha Ressler as Stella Miller
 Karen DiConcetto as Sharon
 Polly Chung as Bank Officer

References

External links

2006 films
2006 drama films
German drama films
English-language German films
Films directed by Holger Ernst
Films shot in New Jersey
2000s English-language films
2000s German films